The Superprestige Gieten is a cyclo-cross race held in Gieten, Netherlands, which was part of the Superprestige and which was organized until 2021.

Past winners

References
 Men's results
 Women's results

Cyclo-cross races
Cycle races in the Netherlands
Recurring sporting events established in 1976
1976 establishments in the Netherlands
Cyclo-cross Superprestige
Cycling in Aa en Hunze